The Austrian Office Taipei  (German: Österreich Büros Taipei) represents the interests of Austria in Taiwan in the absence of formal diplomatic relations, functioning as a de facto embassy. Its counterpart in Austria is the Taipei Economic and Cultural Office in Vienna. 

It was established in 1981 as the Austrian Trade Delegation.
 
The Office is headed by the Director, Albin Mauritz.

See also
 List of diplomatic missions in Taiwan
 List of diplomatic missions of Austria

References

External links

Taipei
Representative Offices in Taipei
1981 establishments in Taiwan
Organizations established in 1981